Venus is the surname of:

 Brenda Venus, American actor and ballet dancer
 Mark Venus (born 1967), English football coach and former player
 Michael Venus (entertainer), Canadian television personality
 Michael Venus (tennis) (born 1987), New Zealand tennis player